Planar hexacoordinate carbon in chemistry describes a molecular geometry featuring a planar arrangement of carbon with six surrounding atoms. No actual chemical compounds having this particular hexacoordinate configuration have been reported but quantum mechanical methods have demonstrated that these molecules are a possibility. Examples of molecules investigated with computational methods are the B6C dianion, the CN3Be3+ ion, the CO3Li3+ ion and the CN3Mg3+ ion. A simulated Be2C monolayer is reported to consist of quasi-planar hexacoordinate carbon atoms.

On the other hand, experimental research has confirmed that the pentagonal-pyramidal hexamethylbenzene ion, C6(CH3)62+, contains a hexacoordinate carbon atom. Furthermore, a heptacoordinate carbon atom has been predicted to be involved in a stable hexagonal-pyramidal configuration of tropylium trication, (C7H7)3+.

References

Carbon